The Netherlands is a country located in Northwestern Europe.

The Netherlands or Nederland may also refer to:

Geography
 Kingdom of the Netherlands, a constitutional monarchy consisting of the constituent country of the Netherlands in Europe and the constituent countries of Aruba, Curaçao, and Sint Maarten in the Caribbean Sea
 The Low Countries sometimes referred to as the "Nether Lands", consisting of the Netherlands, Belgium, Luxembourg, portions of northern France and western Germany
 Netherlands, Missouri, a community in the United States of America

Nederland
 Nederland, Texas, a city in the United States
 Nederland, Colorado, a town in the United States
 Nederland, Overijssel, a hamlet in the municipality of Steenwijkerland, Netherlands

Historical
 Burgundian Netherlands, the "nether lands" belonging to the Duchy of Burgundy (1384–1477)
 Habsburg Netherlands, the lands belonging to the House of Habsburg (1477–1556)
 Spanish Netherlands, the lands belonging to the Spanish Empire (1556–1581/1713)
 The Northern Netherlands, succession from the Spanish Netherlands to form the Dutch Republic (1581–1794)
 The Southern Netherlands, the lands in the southern part, remaining under Spanish control (1581–1713)
 Later the Austrian Netherlands (1713–1794)
 United Kingdom of the Netherlands, consisting of modern-day The Netherlands, Belgium and Luxembourg (1815–1839)

Political 
 Netherlands (European Parliament constituency), in the European Parliament
 Greater Netherlands, a right-wing idea based on the unification of Flanders and the Netherlands

Sports
 :Category:National sports teams of the Netherlands, for teams called "Netherlands"

Arts and literature
 Netherland (novel), a novel by Joseph O'Neill
 "Netherlands" a 7th-season episode of Touched by an Angel
 "Netherlands", a song by Little River Band from the album No Reins
 Nether Lands, an album by Dan Fogelberg

See also

 Terminology of the Low Countries, for information about the difference in use between the Netherlands, Dutch and Holland
 
 
 Dutchland (disambiguation)
 Holland (disambiguation)
 Dutch (disambiguation)
 Nether (disambiguation)
 Land (disambiguation)